Anima is the third studio album by the English musician Thom Yorke, released on 27 June 2019 through XL Recordings. It was produced by Yorke's longtime collaborator Nigel Godrich.

Anima comprises electronic music developed through live performances and studio work, with themes of anxiety and dystopia. It was accompanied by a short film directed by Paul Thomas Anderson, which was released on Netflix and in select IMAX theatres, and a music video for "Last I Heard (...He Was Circling the Drain)". Yorke embarked on an international tour to support the album; later dates were cancelled due to the COVID-19 pandemic.

Anima became Yorke's first number-one album on the Billboard Dance/Electronic Albums chart. It received positive reviews and was nominated for Best Alternative Music Album and Best Boxed or Special Limited Edition Package at the 2020 Grammy Awards. The Anima film received acclaim and was nominated for the Grammy for Best Music Film. The album was followed by the Not the News Rmx EP, featuring an extended version of "Not the News" plus remixes.

Writing and recording
Yorke wrote Anima following a period of writer's block and anxiety. Inspired by seeing the electronic musician Flying Lotus improvising live with loops, Yorke and longtime collaborator Nigel Godrich developed Anima through live performances and studio work. Yorke would send Godrich "sprawling" unfinished tracks and Godrich would edit them into shorter samples and loops, which Yorke wrote vocals to. They performed several Anima tracks, including "Not the News", on the tour for Yorke's previous album Tomorrow's Modern Boxes. Philip Selway, the drummer for Yorke's band Radiohead, contributed "sped-up drums" to "Impossible Knots". Joey Waronker, the drummer for another Yorke project, Atoms for Peace, appears on the end of "The Axe".

Music and lyrics
Anima comprises electronic music with "layers of electronic fuzz and deconstructed noise".  Pitchfork characterised it as "full of wraithlike frequencies and fibrillating pulses". Yorke said its themes include anxiety and dystopia; he felt that dystopian environments were "a really good way of expressing anxiety creatively". The title Anima, a reference to the psychoanalyst Carl Jung's concepts of the anima and animus, came from Yorke's interest in dreams.

The Independent liked the opening track, "Traffic", to the "heady grooves and pulses" of the electronic artist Floating Points. "Dawn Chorus" is a "reverential song about loss, nostalgia, and regret" with "hushed", almost-spoken vocals. The "Not the News" melody resembles a ticking clock and builds to a "mass of chaotic orchestration". "Impossible Knots" features a "propulsive electric bassline", and the final track, "Runwayaway", has "trance-like" blues guitar.

Promotion and release
Anima was promoted with a viral marketing campaign. In June 2019, posters in cities around the world appeared advertising "Anima Technologies", a company claiming to be able to recover lost dreams with a "dream camera". Calling the advertised number led to a prerecorded message advising that Anima Technologies had been "seized" after "unlawful activities", followed by part of the track "Not the News". This was followed by projections on London landmarks.

Yorke announced Anima on social media on 20 June. It was released as a download and on streaming services on 27 June 2019, followed by CD and vinyl editions on 19 July 2019. The vinyl edition includes a bonus track, "Ladies & Gentlemen, Thank You For Coming".

On 2 August, Yorke released the Not the News Rmx EP on digital platforms, comprising an extended version of "Not the News" plus remixes by Mark Pritchard, Clark and Equiknoxx. A limited-edition white-label vinyl version followed. A music video for "Last I Heard (...He Was Circling the Drain)", blending 16mm, 3D and cel animation, was released on 30 October.

To support Anima, Yorke embarked on an international tour, performing with Godrich and visual artist Tarik Barri. A North American tour was due to begin in March 2020, but was cancelled due to the COVID-19 pandemic.

Film 

Anima was accompanied by a 15-minute film directed by Paul Thomas Anderson. The Anima film was played in some IMAX theatres and released on Netflix on the day of the album release. It features Yorke's partner, the actress Dajana Roncione, plus choreography by Damien Jalet, cinematography by Darius Khondji and projections by Tarik Barri. In the film, Yorke rides a train of uniformed passengers ("Not the News"), meets the eye of a woman (Roncione) and pursues her when she forgets her bag ("Traffic"). They meet in the street, dance together and board a tram ("Dawn Chorus").

The film began with a concept from Yorke about workers whose "bodies don't work any more" and are being "pushed by an invisible force". The team wanted the first sequence to be "oppressive and hyper-precise so it feels like a machine", influenced by dystopian stories such as Nineteen Eighty-Four and Metropolis and the physical comedy of Charlie Chaplin. For the "Traffic" sequence, the team created a platform inclined at a 34-degree angle and placed the camera at the same angle, erasing the slope.

At the review aggregator website Rotten Tomatoes, the Anima film holds an approval rating of 100% based on 21 reviews, with an average rating of 8.05/10. It was nominated for Best Music Film at the 2020 Grammy Awards.

Sales 
Anima entered at number 50 on the UK Albums Chart, and re-entered at number five following its retail release three weeks later. It was Yorke's tenth UK top-ten album (including his work with Radiohead), and his second top-ten solo album (after his 2006 album The Eraser). Anima became Yorke's first number-one album on the Billboard Dance/Electronic Albums chart, selling 10,000 album-equivalent units in the week ending July 25, nearly all from traditional sales. "Traffic" was Yorke's first entry on the Dance/Electronic Songs chart, and reached number 47.

Critical reception

At Metacritic, which assigns a normalised rating out of 100 to reviews from mainstream critics, Anima has an average score of 84, based on 28 reviews, which indicates "universal acclaim". Philip Sherburne of Pitchfork awarded it the week's "Best New Music", writing that it was Yorke's most ambitious and assured solo album and the first that felt complete without Radiohead. TheGuardian critic Alexis Petridis observed "a preponderance of dance rhythms" but "very little of dance music's propulsive dynamics", and felt the melodies were "fragmentary and vaporous". He concluded that Anima was "like a glimpse through an artist’s sketchbook, interesting rather than essential". At the 2020 Grammy Awards, Anima was nominated for Best Alternative Music Album and Best Boxed or Special Limited Edition Package.

Accolades

Track listing

Personnel
Credits adapted from the liner notes of Anima.

Additional musicians
 Joey Waronker – drums at the end of "The Axe"
 Philip Selway – sped-up drums on "Impossible Knots"
 London Contemporary Orchestra and Choir
 Hugh Brunt – conducting, orchestrations
 Talia Morey – copy
 Galya Bisengalieva (leader), Alessandro Ruisi, Zara Benyounes, Alexandra Caldon, Venetia Jollands, Patrick Savage, Anna Ovsyanikova, Marianne Haynes – first violins
 Eloisa-Fleur Thom, Emily Holland, Gillon Cameron, Guy Button, Nicole Stokes, Francesca Barritt, Violeta Barreña, Ed McCullagh – second violins
 Ian Anderson, Clifton Harrison, Matt Kettle, Matthew Maguire, Diana Matthews, Alison D'Souza, Jenny Lewisohn, Meghan Cassidy – violas
 Brian O'Kane, Reinoud Ford, Jonny Byers, Gregor Riddell, Zoe Martlew, Sergio Serra – cellos
 Dave Brown, Roger Linley, Laurence Ungless, Gwen Reed – double basses
 Pasha Mansurov (solo: piccolo, alto and bass), Zinajda Kodrič (II: alto and bass), Gareth Mclearnon (III: alto, bass and contrabass) – flutes
 Craig Apps, Zands Duggan, Louise Anna Duggan – percussion
 Josephine Stephenson, Héloïse Werner, Fiona Fraser, Harriet Armston-Clarke, Laurel Neighbour, Eleanor Gregory – sopranos
 Rose Martin, Katie Schofield, Amy Lyddon, Emma Lewis, Lissie Paul, Judy Brown – altos

Technical personnel
 Nigel Godrich – production
 Bob Ludwig – mastering

Artwork
 Stanley Donwood – artwork ("graphite")
 Thom Yorke (credited as Tchocky) – artwork ("graphite")

Charts

Year-end charts

References

2019 albums
Albums produced by Nigel Godrich
Thom Yorke albums
XL Recordings albums
Films based on albums